Neacerea testacea is a moth of the subfamily Arctiinae. It was described by Herbert Druce in 1884. It is found in Guatemala, Panama and Honduras.

References

Euchromiina
Moths described in 1884